Deep Foods is a food manufacturer based in Union Township, Union County, New Jersey that was founded in 1977 when Gujarati delicacies  made by Bhagwati Amin became popular among her neighborhood families and local grocers. To meet the growing demand, in 1977, Bhagwati and her husband began work on what is today Deep Foods Inc. and specializes in frozen prepared Indian foods. The company previously produced the Tandoor Chef line of frozen food products, which they rebranded as Deep Indian Kitchen in 2019. The company also produces products such as frozen vegetarian naan pizzas, which are produced entirely in India, and 14 flavors of ice cream. They launched a fast-casual restaurant chain in NYC in 2015, which offers a Chipotle-style ordering menu for Indian cuisine.  The restaurants were previously called Indikitch and were rebranded to Deep Indian Kitchen in 2019.

Certifications
The company obtained Halal certification for its frozen chicken and lamb products in 2012.

See also
 List of food companies

References

External links
 Official website

Food manufacturers of the United States
Indian cuisine outside India
Companies based in Union County, New Jersey
Indian diaspora in the United States